Aydın Yılmaz (born 29 January 1988) is a Turkish professional footballer.

Early life
1988 born in Istanbul Aydın Yılmaz, Florya Metin Oktay Facilities at 9 years old football player stepped into audition. Aydın Yılmaz into junior team of Galatasaray in 2001, under the Danone in 2002, Galatasaray shirt Championship fight took place in the squad.

Club career

Galatasaray
On 22 January 2006, Aydın scored a last-minute winning goal for Galatasaray against Konyaspor after coming on as a substitute for his debut game in the Süper Lig. That goal was seen as one of the cornerstones of the famous 2006 title of Galatasaray. On 4 June 2008 he signed a 5-year deal with his club Galatasaray.

Manisaspor
Was transferred to the 2007-08 season on loan at Manisaspor.

Istanbul BB
Second half of the 2007-08 season on loan at Istanbul BB team played in seven games. The name appears to be the most effective team in recent weeks, especially Aydin, at the end of the season again returned to Galatasaray.

Eskisehirspor
Aydin was loaned to Eskisehirspor for the 2009-10 season with a buying option, Eskisehirspor didn't use this option and he returned to Galatasaray.

Return to Galatasaray

2011-12 season
2011-12 season, 27 Aydin week of Mersin İdman Yurdu included in the game play in this match later earned a penalty and has been one of the biggest factors in winning team 3 points. Sivasspor match played later on in the game, including 29 weeks in the match with a goal-scoring success in Aydin and said after the game that the said gift to this goal in the new-born daughter. He played 15 matches in the league and he was among the champion squad.

2012-13 season

Aydın considered as a good alternative player for 2012-13 Süper Lig Season. He made 17 league and 2 Turkish Cup appearances including his team dramatically eliminated by 1461 Trabzon. After new superstars Wesley Sneijder and Didier Drogba joined to team Aydın was relegated to the out of bench and he started to take less minutes on league matches. He also represented his team in Champions League against Sporting Braga for both home and away matches and Aydın scored a critical goal at Municipal Stadium which guaranteed Galatasaray to promote knockout phase.

International career
Aydın played for the Turkish U-17 team that came 4th in the 2005 world youth championship in Peru. On 4 October 2008, he has been picked up to Turkey to play against Bosnia and Estonia.

Aydın made his debut for the Turkish national team on October 16, 2012, in an 2014 FIFA World Cup qualifier against Hungary.

Honours
Galatasaray
Süper Lig (4): 2005–06, 2011–12, 2012–13, 2014–15
 Türkiye Kupası (2): 2013–14, 2014–15
Süper Kupa (3): 2008, 2012, 2013

Career statistics

Club
.

International

References

External links

Profile at Galatasaray.org

1988 births
People from Bakırköy
Living people
Turkish footballers
Turkey youth international footballers
Turkey under-21 international footballers
Turkey B international footballers
Turkey international footballers
Association football midfielders
Galatasaray A2 footballers
Galatasaray S.K. footballers
Manisaspor footballers
İstanbul Başakşehir F.K. players
Eskişehirspor footballers
Kasımpaşa S.K. footballers
Adana Demirspor footballers
Sakaryaspor footballers
1. FK Příbram players
Menemenspor footballers
İskenderun FK footballers
Süper Lig players
TFF First League players
TFF Second League players
TFF Third League players
Turkish expatriate footballers
Expatriate footballers in the Czech Republic
Turkish expatriate sportspeople in the Czech Republic
Footballers from Istanbul